The  serves Fukuoka, Japan. It consists of three subway lines, the Kūkō, or Airport Line, the Hakozaki Line and the Nanakuma Line).

The lines are operated by the Fukuoka City Transportation Bureau. Unlike most other public operators in Japan, the company only operates subways without any bus lines.

All stations are equipped with automatic platform gates. All lines are automatically operated by ATO system, although drivers are used as a precaution. The lines introduced Hayakaken, a smart card system from March 2009. This superseded the prepaid magnetic card systems.

Lines

Airport rail link
Visitors traveling to Fukuoka by Shinkansen (bullet train) disembark at JR Hakata Station. They can then transfer to the Fukuoka City Subway system by changing to Hakata Subway station, located under JR Hakata station. Fukuoka Airport is also linked to the Fukuoka City Subway. Downtown Fukuoka City can be reached in about 10 minutes by subway, making Fukuoka Airport one of the most accessible major-city airports in the world.

Station logos
Fukuoka City Subway employs unique logos (symbol mark and symbol color) for each station, much like Mexico City Metro. For example, Fukuokakūkō Station (Airport), has a logo symbolizing an airplane.

Rolling stock

 1000 series, 2000 series: Kūkō Line, Hakozaki Line
 3000・3000A series: Nanakuma Line

Fares 
Ticket prices for the subway lines are determined by the distance traveled (¥200-340). Tickets for the subway can be purchased at all subway station ticket machines.

Special tickets

Magnetic cards 

 (unlimited travel for one day)
Kūkō Line, Nanakuma Line, Hakozaki Line
¥640
, priced at ¥100, is available only to children during school vacation periods. A coupon is attached to the ticket which may be exchanged for a McDonald's hamburger.
 (unlimited travel for two days, limited to foreign tourists only)
Kūkō Line, Nanakuma Line, Hakozaki Line
¥720

Kūkō Line, Nanakuma Line, Hakozaki Line

Kūkō Line, Nanakuma Line, Hakozaki Line (unlimited travel)
1 Month: ¥12,000
3 Months: ¥34,200
6 Months: ¥64,800

Contactless smart card

Kūkō Line, Nanakuma Line, Hakozaki Line
Hayakaken is a rechargeable contactless smart card for the Fukuoka City Subway.  It can also be used as a Commuter Pass (Chika Pass is included) except as a transferable pass for other company's lines.  Starting in 2010, it became compatible with Nishi-Nippon Railroad's nimoca, JR Kyushu's SUGOCA and JR East's Suica. As of March 2013, it also became compatible with PASMO, Manaca, PiTaPa, JR West's ICOCA, JR Central's TOICA and JR Hokkaido's Kitaca.

For details, please see Hayakaken.

Fukuoka City Transportation Bureau
 is a public organization of transportation in Fukuoka, Japan. The organization operates subways. It was founded in 1973.

Network map

See also
 Transport in Fukuoka-Kitakyūshū
 List of metro systems

References

External links
 Fukuoka City Subway – official website  
 website 
 Fukuoka City Subway map

 
Underground rapid transit in Japan
Intermodal transport authorities in Japan
1981 establishments in Japan